The Southern Rhaetian Alps  (Südliche Rätische Alpen in German, Alpi Retiche meridionali in  Italian) are a mountain range in the southern part of the Alps.

Geography 
Administratively the range belongs to the Italian regions of Trentino-Alto Adige and Lombardy.

SOIUSA classification 
According to SOIUSA (International Standardized Mountain Subdivision of the Alps) the mountain range is an Alpine section, classified in the following way:
 main part = Eastern Alps
 major sector = Southern Limestone Alps
 section =Southern Rhaetian Alps
 code =  II/C-28

Subdivision 
The range is subdivided into four subsections: 
Alpi dell'Ortles - SOIUSA code: II/C-28.I,
Alpi della Val di Non - SOIUSA code: II/C-28.II,
Alpi dell'Adamello e della Presanella - SOIUSA code: II/C-28.III;
Dolomiti di Brenta - SOIUSA code: II/C-28.IV.

Notable summits

Some notable summits of the Southern Rhaetian Alps are:

Notable passes

Some notable passes of the Southern Rhaetian Alps are:
 Croce Domini Pass
 Gavia Pass
 Mendelpass
 Mortirolo Pass
 Stelvio Pass
 Tonale Pass

References

Maps
 Italian official cartography (Istituto Geografico Militare - IGM); on-line version: www.pcn.minambiente.it

Mountain ranges of the Alps
Mountain ranges of Lombardy
Landforms of Trentino-Alto Adige/Südtirol